Little Rock is an unincorporated community and census-designated place (CDP) in Dillon County, South Carolina, United States. Per the 2020 census, the population was 658.

The community is at the northwest end of the concurrency between South Carolina Highways 9 and 57. 

The James W. Hamer House and St. Paul's Methodist Church are listed on the U.S. National Register of Historic Places. The median home price in Little Rock was $37,900 in 2017. There is no metro area in Little Rock.

The only railroad service within Little Rock is the CSX Andrews Subdivision, a former Seaboard Air Line Railroad line that now serves only freight.

Demographics

2020 census

Note: the US Census treats Hispanic/Latino as an ethnic category. This table excludes Latinos from the racial categories and assigns them to a separate category. Hispanics/Latinos can be of any race.

References

Census-designated places in Dillon County, South Carolina
Census-designated places in South Carolina
Unincorporated communities in Dillon County, South Carolina
Unincorporated communities in South Carolina